Ramadhan Saputra (born on May 5, 1986) is an Indonesian professional footballer.

Club statistics

References

External links
 Ramadhan Saputra at Liga Indonesia
 Ramadhan Saputra at Soccerway

1986 births
Association football defenders
Living people
Indonesian footballers
Indonesian Premier Division players
Liga 1 (Indonesia) players
Persita Tangerang
Semen Padang F.C. players
PSMS Medan players
Persiwa Wamena players